Samuel Adrian Baugh (March 17, 1914 – December 17, 2008) was an American professional football player and coach. During his college and professional careers, he most notably played quarterback, but also played as a safety and punter. He played college football for the Horned Frogs at Texas Christian University, where he was a twice All-American.  He then played in the National Football League (NFL) for the Washington Redskins for 16 seasons from 1937 to 1952. After his playing career, he served as a college coach for Hardin–Simmons University before coaching professionally for the New York Titans and the Houston Oilers.

In both of his Player of the Year seasons, he led the league in completions, attempts, completion percentage, and yards. In 1947, he also led the league in passing touchdowns, interception percentage and passer rating.

Primarily known for his passing prowess, Baugh led the league in completion percentage a record eight times, passing yards four times, and three times in passer rating, among other statistics. However, he was also known for his versatility—having the ability to play at a high level as a punter as well as a defensive back. His average of 51.4 yards per punt during the  season stood as the single-season record for 82 seasons until Tennessee Titans rookie Ryan Stonehouse broke it with a 53.1 average in the  season.

Baugh was inducted into the Pro Football Hall of Fame in the 17-member charter class of 1963, and was also selected to the NFL 75th Anniversary All-Time Team in 1994 and the NFL 100th Anniversary All-Time Team in 2019.

Early life
Samuel Adrian Baugh was born on a farm near Temple, Texas, the second son of James, a worker on the Santa Fe Railroad, and Lucy Baugh.  His parents later divorced and his mother raised the three children.  When he was 16, the family then moved to Sweetwater, Texas, and he attended Sweetwater High School.  As the quarterback of his high school football team (Sweetwater Mustangs), he would practice for hours throwing a football through a swinging automobile tire, often on the run.  Baugh would practice punting more than throwing.

Baugh, however, really wanted to become a professional baseball player and almost received a scholarship to play at Washington State University.  About a month before he started at Washington State, however, Baugh hurt his knee while sliding into second base during a game, and the scholarship fell through.

College career

College football
After coach Dutch Meyer told him he could play three sports (football, baseball, and basketball), Baugh attended Texas Christian University.  While at Texas Christian, he threw 587 passes in his three varsity seasons for 39 touchdowns.  Baugh was named an All-American in 1935 and 1936.  He also led TCU to two bowl game wins, a 3–2 victory over LSU in the 1936 Sugar Bowl, and a 16–6 victory over Marquette in the first annual Cotton Bowl Classic in 1937 after which he was named MVP.  He finished fourth in voting for the Heisman Trophy in 1936.

In the spring of his senior year, Redskins owner George Preston Marshall offered Baugh $4,000 to play with the franchise.  Originally unsure about playing professional football (coach Meyer offered him a job as the freshman coach and he still thought about playing professional baseball), he did not agree to the contract until after the College All-Star Game, where the team beat the Green Bay Packers 6–0.

College and minor league baseball
Baugh was also a baseball player at Texas Christian, where he played third base.  It was during his time as a baseball player that he earned the nickname "Slingin' Sammy", which he got from a Texas sportswriter.  After college, Sammy signed a contract with the St. Louis Cardinals and was sent to the minor leagues to play with the American Association Columbus Red Birds in Columbus, Ohio after being converted to shortstop.  He was then sent to the International League's Rochester, New York Red Wings, St. Louis's other top farm club.  While there he received little playing time behind starting shortstop Marty Marion and was unhappy with his prospects. He then turned to professional football.

Professional career

As expected, Baugh was drafted in the first round (sixth overall) of the 1937 NFL Draft by the Washington Redskins, the same year the team moved from Boston. He signed a one-year contract with the Redskins and received $8,000, making him the highest-paid player on the team.

During his rookie season in 1937, Baugh played quarterback (although in Washington's formation he was officially lined up as a tailback or halfback until 1944), defensive back, and punter, set an NFL record for completions with 91 in 218 attempts and threw for a league-high 1,127 yards. He led the Redskins to the NFL Championship game against the Chicago Bears, where he finished 17 of 33 for 335 yards and his second-half touchdown passes of 55, 78 and 33 yards gave Washington a 28–21 victory. His 335 passing yards remained the most ever in a playoff game by any rookie quarterback in NFL history until Russell Wilson broke the record in 2012. The Redskins and Bears would meet three times in championship games between 1940 and 1943. In the 1940 Championship game, the Bears recorded the most one-sided victory in NFL history, beating Washington 73–0. After the game, Baugh was asked what would have happened if the Redskins' first drive had resulted in a touchdown. He shrugged and replied "What? The score would have been 73–7."

Baugh's heyday would come during World War II. In 1942, Baugh and the Redskins won the East Conference with a 10–1 record. During the same season the Bears went 11–0 and outscored their opponents 376–84. In the 1942 Championship game, Baugh threw a touchdown pass and kept the Bears in their own territory with some strong punts, including an 85-yard quick kick, and Washington won 14–6.

Baugh had what many consider to be the greatest single-season performance by a pro football player during 1943 in which he led the league in pass completions, punting (45.9-yard average) and interceptions (11). One of Baugh's more memorable single-game performances during the season was when he threw four touchdown passes and intercepted four passes in a 42–20 victory over Detroit. He was selected as an All-Pro tailback that year. The Redskins again made it to the championship game, but lost to the Bears 41–21. During the game, Baugh suffered a concussion while tackling Bears quarterback Sid Luckman and had to leave.

During the 1945 season, Baugh completed 128 of 182 passes for a 70.33 completion percentage, which was an NFL record then and remains the fourth-best today (to Ken Anderson, 70.55 in 1982, and Drew Brees, 70.62 in 2009, 71.23 in 2011). He threw 11 touchdown passes and only four interceptions. The Redskins again won the East Conference but lost 15–14 in the 1945 Championship game against the Cleveland Rams. The one-point margin of victory came under scrutiny because of a safety that occurred early in the game. In the first quarter, the Redskins had the ball at their own 5-yard line. Dropping back into the end zone, Baugh threw to an open receiver, but the ball hit the goal post (which at the time was on the goal line instead of at the back of the end zone) and bounced back to the ground in the end zone. Under the rules at the time, this was ruled as a safety and thus gave the Rams a 2–0 lead. It was that safety that proved to be the margin of victory. Owner Marshall was so angry at the outcome that he became a major force in passing the following major rule change after the season: A forward pass that strikes the goal posts is automatically ruled incomplete. This later became known as the "Baugh/Marshall Rule".

One of Baugh's more memorable single performances came on "Sammy Baugh Day" on November 23, 1947. That day, the Washington D.C. Touchdown Club honored him at Griffith Stadium and gave him a station wagon. Against the Chicago Cardinals he passed for 355 yards and six touchdowns. That season, the Redskins finished 4–8, but Baugh had career highs in completions (210), attempts (354), yards (2,938) and touchdown passes (25), leading the league in all four categories.

Baugh played for five more years—leading the league in completion percentage for the sixth and seventh times in 1948 and 1949. He then retired after the 1952 season. In his final game, a 27–21 win over Philadelphia at Griffith Stadium, he played for several minutes before retiring to a prolonged standing ovation from the crowd. Baugh won numerous NFL passing titles and earned first-team All-NFL honors four times in his career. He completed 1,693 of 2,995 passes for 21,886 yards.

Records 
By the time he retired, Baugh set 13 NFL records in three player positions: quarterback, punter, and defensive back. He is considered one of the all-time great football players. He gave birth to the fanaticism of Redskins fans. As Michael Wilbon of The Washington Post says: "He brought not just victories but thrills and ignited Washington with a passion even the worst Redskins periods can barely diminish." He was the first to play the position of quarterback as it is played today, the first to make of the forward pass an effective weapon rather than an "act of desperation".

Two of his records as quarterback still stand: most seasons leading the league in passing (six; tied with Steve Young) and most seasons leading the league with the lowest interception percentage (five). He is also fourth in highest single-season completion percentage (70.33), most seasons leading the league in yards gained (four) and most seasons leading the league in completion percentage (seven).

As a punter, Baugh retired with the NFL record for highest punting average in a career (45.1 yards), and is still second all-time (only Shane Lechler has passed him with 46.5 yards), and has the second-best (51.4 in 1940) and fifth-best (48.7 in 1941) season marks. He led the league in punting from 1940 through 1943. His single-season record of 51.4 average yards per punt during the 1940 season was held for 82 seasons until Tennessee Titans rookie punter Ryan Stonehouse broke it with a 53.1 average in the 2022 season.

As a defensive back, he was the first player in league history to intercept four passes in a game, and is the only player to lead the league in passing, punting, and interceptions in the same season.

As one of the best-known of the early NFL quarterbacks, Baugh is likely to be compared to more recent great players. As noted by Michael Wilbon in The Washington Post, the football of Baugh's era was rounder at the ends and fatter in the middle than the one used today, making it far more difficult to pass well (or even to create a proper spiral). Additionally, it is important to point out that pass-interference rules have intensified dramatically, inflating modern quarterbacks' statistics.

Coaching career
While playing for the Redskins, Baugh and teammate Wayne Millner were assistant coaches with The Catholic University of America's Cardinals, and went with them to the 1940 Sun Bowl.  Baugh left Washington, D.C. in 1952. He chose not to return for Redskins team functions, despite repeated organization invitations. After his playing career, he became head coach at Hardin–Simmons University where he compiled a 23–28 record between 1955 and 1959.

Baugh was the first coach of the New York Titans (which eventually became the New York Jets) of the American Football League in 1960 and 1961 compiling a record of 14–14. He was an assistant at the University of Tulsa in 1963 under head coach Glenn Dobbs. At Tulsa, he coached All-American quarterback Jerry Rhome. In 1964, Baugh coached the AFL's Houston Oilers and went 4–10.

Acting
Baugh also took up acting. In 1941, he made $6,400 for starring in a 12-week serial as a dark-haired Texas Ranger named Tom King. The serial, called King of the Texas Rangers, was released by Republic Studios. The episodes ran in theaters as Saturday matinees; it also starred Duncan Renaldo, later famous as TV's Cisco Kid.

Robert Duvall patterned the role of Gus McCrae in the television series Lonesome Dove after Baugh, particularly his arm movements, after visiting him at his home in Texas in 1988.

Personal and later life
After retiring from football, Baugh and his wife Edmonia Smith moved to his Double Mountain ranch west of Aspermont, Texas, where they had four boys and a girl.  Edmonia died in 1990, after 52 years of marriage to Baugh, who was her high school sweetheart. According to his son, Baugh derived far more pleasure from ranching than he ever had from football, saying that he enjoyed the game, but if he could live his life over again, he probably wouldn't play sports at all.

Similar to the nicknaming of fellow football great Byron "Whizzer" White of Colorado, he said sports writers had tagged him with "Slingin' Sammy" whereas Sam was his preferred name. He always introduced himself as Sam Baugh and signed his papers and autographs that way. TCU named its football practice center the Sam Baugh Football Center with that perspective in mind.

Baugh's health began to decline after the death of his wife. During his last years, he lived in a nursing home in a little West Texas town called Jayton not far from Double Mountain Ranch.

Death
The Associated Press quoted Baugh's son on December 17, 2008, saying Baugh had died after numerous health issues, including Alzheimer's disease, at Fisher County Hospital in Rotan, Texas. He is interred at Belvieu Cemetery in Rotan.

Honors and tributes
Baugh was the last surviving member of the 17-member charter class of the Pro Football Hall of Fame.  Additionally, he was honored by the Redskins with the retirement of his jersey number, No. 33, one of only four numbers officially retired by the team.

Hip hop artist Jay-Z wore Baugh's Mitchell & Ness 1947 Washington jersey in his 2002 video for "Girls, Girls, Girls." This increased demand for the throwback jersey and renewed popular awareness of Baugh.

Additional Honors
 A street in his hometown of Rotan, Texas
 50th Anniversary Team by the NFL (1969)
 75th Anniversary Team by the NFL (1994), included in Madden NFL 10
 36th greatest athlete of the 20th century by Burt Randolph Sugar (1995)
 64th greatest athlete of the 20th century by ESPN (1999)
 43rd greatest athlete of the 20th century by the Associated Press (1999)
 3rd greatest NFL player of the 20th century by the Associated Press (1999)
 11th greatest NFL player of the 20th century by The Sporting News (1999) (highest-ranking player for the Redskins)
 Scripps-Howard all-time college football team (1999)
 14th greatest NFL player of all-time by NFL Network/NFL Films (2010)
 4th greatest college football player by SPORT magazine (1999)
 3rd greatest college football player by College Football News (2003)
 7th greatest college football player by Brad Rawlins (2006)
 5th greatest college football player by ESPN (2007)
 Named starting quarterback, defensive back and punter of the Cold, Hard Football Facts.com "All-Time 11" (2006)
 Named as the Most Versatile Player of all-time by the NFL Network (2007).
 Has his number (21) retired at Sweetwater High School, his alma mater.
 Had a children's home in Jayton, Kent County, Texas named in his honor.
 TCU's indoor practice facility is named after him.
 Included as an All-Player Legend on Madden NFL 25 and Madden NFL 15 as a quarterback.
 The golf course at Western Texas College (http://sammybaughgolf.com) is named for him.

NFL career statistics

Source:

Head coaching record

College

AFL

See also
 List of NCAA major college football yearly passing leaders
 List of NCAA major college football yearly total offense leaders

References

External links

 
 
 
 
 

1914 births
2008 deaths
American football punters
American football quarterbacks
American football safeties
Catholic University Cardinals football coaches
Hardin–Simmons Cowboys football coaches
Houston Oilers head coaches
New York Titans head coaches
Sportspeople from Abilene, Texas
TCU Horned Frogs football players
TCU Horned Frogs men's basketball players
Tulsa Golden Hurricane football coaches
Washington Redskins players
All-American college football players
College Football Hall of Fame inductees
Eastern Conference Pro Bowl players
Pro Football Hall of Fame inductees
National Football League players with retired numbers
People from Temple, Texas
Players of American football from Texas
People from Rotan, Texas
People from Sweetwater, Texas
Male actors from Texas
Ranchers from Texas
American men's basketball players